Lennart Larsson (born 9 July 1953) is a Swedish former footballer who played as a midfielder.

Career
Born in Stockholm, Larsson began his career in Hässleholms IF in 1976 when he went to play with Halmstads BK and won Allsvenskan the same year. In 1977, he was sold to FC Schalke 04 in the Bundesliga. He played two seasons there as a midfielder and went back to Halmstad in 1979–82 for a second time and became Swedish champion again in 1979, the club's second title. 

Larsson was capped 26 times for the Sweden national team between 1976 and 1981 and was a part of the squad in the 1978 FIFA World Cup.

References

External links
 

1953 births
Living people
Footballers from Stockholm
Association football midfielders
Swedish footballers
Sweden international footballers
1978 FIFA World Cup players
IFK Malmö Fotboll players
Hässleholms IF players
Halmstads BK players
FC Schalke 04 players
Bundesliga players
Expatriate footballers in West Germany
Swedish expatriate sportspeople in West Germany